Claire Ruiz Hartell (born 28 November 1997) also known for her screen name Claire Ruiz is a Filipino Australian actress, singer, dancer and model, best known for her roles in the television series Be Careful with my Heart as Joey Acosta, Beki Boxer as Venus, A Love to Last as Gena Maalaala Mo Kaya as Abe/Abegail Mesa  and A Family Affair as Florabelle/Belle Ramirez. She is an actress and talent of ABS-CBN's Star Magic.

Filmography

Film

Television

References

https://web.archive.org/web/20180128190601/https://www.pinoynewsonline.info/claire-ruiz-stars-in-mmk-episode-about-a-woman-abused-at-a-partytrending/

https://push.abs-cbn.com/2018/1/23/photos/10-photos-of-claire-ruiz-that-proves-she-is-destin-176769

External links
 
 

Filipino film actresses
Filipino television actresses
Filipino people of Australian descent
Filipino female models
Australian film actresses
Australian television actresses
Australian people of Filipino descent
Star Magic
Australian female models
People from Angeles City
Actresses from Pampanga
1997 births
Living people
Pilipinas Got Talent contestants
Australian child actresses
Australian actresses of Asian descent